The 2008 Masters of Curling was held January 23–27, 2008 at the Credit Union Centre in Saskatoon, Saskatchewan. It was the third Grand Slam event of the 2007-08 curling season.

Glenn Howard's rink won their second straight Masters tournament, defeating Kevin Koe's rink in the final. Howard's rink won $C24,000 and the total purse of the event was $100,000.

The Masters would be held again in November 2008, in the following season in which the same two teams would play in the final.

Draw

Pool A

Pool B

Pool C

Playoffs
Tie breakers:
Ferland 6-5 Gushue

External links
WCT Event site

Masters Of Curling (January), 2008
Curling in Saskatoon
2008 in Saskatchewan
Masters (curling)